This is the discography of Nigerian rapper Olamide.

Albums

Studio albums

Collaboration albums

EPs

Singles

As lead artist

As featured artist
 "Buate" by KING STUNNA (2012) 
 "Shoki" Remix by Lil Kesh
 "Jagaban" Remix by Ycee
 "Ibadi E" by D'banj {2013}
 "The Money" by  Davido {2015}
 "Local Rappers" by Reminisce (2015)
 "Blow Am" by Duncan Mighty {2013}
 "Standing Ovation" by Tiwa Savage (2016)
 "Fine Girls" by Wale (2017)
 "Fada Fada" by Phyno (2018)
 "Ghost Mode" Phyno
 "Onyeoma" by Phyno (2018)
 "Omo Lepa" by Danny Young (2012)
 "My Body" by Zlatan Ibile
 "Piom Piom" by DJ Prince and Phyno (2019)
 "Pim Pim" by Dice Ailes (2020)
 "Zazoo Zeh" by Portable & Poco Lee (2021)
 "i'm in love' Remix by Harrysong {2013}
 "Vision" by Bella Shmurda  {2020}
 "Skelele" by Bad Boy Timz {2021}
 "ZaZoo" By Portable {2021}
 "Sometimes" Remix by T.I Blaze
 "Afar" by Fireboy DML
 "Omo Ope" by Asake

References

Discographies of Nigerian artists